Krasny is a rural locality (a settlement) in Yelanskoye Urban Settlement, Yelansky District, Volgograd Oblast, Russia. The population was 128 as of 2010. There are 2 streets.

Geography 
Krasny is located on Khopyorsko-Buzulukskaya Plain, on the right bank of the Yelan River, 7 km southwest of Yelan (the district's administrative centre) by road. Yelan is the nearest rural locality.

References 

Rural localities in Yelansky District